Kim Christensen (born 8 May 1980) is a Danish football coach and former professional player. He manages Frederiksværk FK.

Christensen scored a single goal in nine games for the Denmark under-21 national football team from 2000 to 2001.

Career

Early career
Born in Frederiksværk, Christensen started his career with Danish club Lyngby BK. In December 2001, Christensen moved abroad to play for German club Hamburger SV in a DKK 500,000 transfer deal. He had a hard time forcing his way into the starting line-up, and left the club to join Dutch club FC Twente in the summer 2003. At Twente, he found playing time once more.

When his Twente contract ran out in July 2005, Christensen moved back to Denmark on a free transfer to play for Brøndby IF. Following a single year at Brøndby, he moved to league rivals OB in the summer 2006. In August 2007 he transferred to Barnsley.

On 23 June 2008, he signed a two-year contract with FC Midtjylland.

Barnsley
Christensen received international clearance and was able to make his debut against Colchester United. He was named as a substitute but came on in the 73rd minute and his shot won a penalty through handball which Brian Howard dispatched. In further matches he continued to come on in a substitute role and scored his first goal for the club in an away game at Charlton Athletic, an injury time equaliser which earned the team a point.

Frederiksværk Fodbold Klub
After Kim ended his career on the pitch, he decided to join his local childhood club FFK. He is a very successful coach now, and he is playing with his team in Serie 2, which is the 9'th best league in Denmark.

References

External links
 Danish national team profile 
 
 
 DanskFodbold.com statistics 

1980 births
Akademisk Boldklub players
Barnsley F.C. players
Brøndby IF players
Bundesliga players
Danish expatriate men's footballers
Danish men's footballers
Danish Superliga players
Danish 1st Division players
Denmark under-21 international footballers
Eredivisie players
Expatriate footballers in England
Expatriate footballers in Germany
Expatriate footballers in the Netherlands
FC Midtjylland players
FC Twente players
Hamburger SV players
Living people
Lyngby Boldklub players
Odense Boldklub players
English Football League players
Association football forwards
People from Frederiksværk
Sportspeople from the Capital Region of Denmark